is a railway station in Uji, Kyoto, Japan.

Lines
Kintetsu Railway
Kyoto Line

Layout
The station has two platforms serving two tracks.

Platforms

History
3 November 1928 – Opened as a station on the Nara Electric Railway (NER)
1 October 1963 – NER acquired by the Kintetsu Railway
1 April 2007 – PiTaPa smart-card ticketing introduced

Adjacent stations

Railway stations in Kyoto Prefecture
Railway stations in Japan opened in 1928